Andrew Jackson Reese (February 7, 1904 – January 10, 1966) was a professional baseball player. He played all or part of four seasons in Major League Baseball for the New York Giants, appearing at all four infield and all three outfield positions. His older brother was Vanderbilt halfback Gil Reese.

As a multi–sport athlete at Vanderbilt University, Andy Reese allegedly began play in minor league baseball in his hometown for the 1925 Tupelo Wolves under the pseudonym Tidbit Bynum in order to protect his collegiate eligibility. However, Vanderbilt coaches became aware of his professional baseball play, ending his college athletic career. Reese then continued in his baseball career.

In 331 games over four seasons, Reese posted a .281 batting average (321-for-1142) with 166 runs, 14 home runs and 111 RBI. He finished his career with a .950 fielding percentage.

References

External links

Major League Baseball infielders
Major League Baseball outfielders
New York Giants (NL) players
Tupelo Wolves players
Memphis Chickasaws players
Bridgeport Bears (baseball) players
Oakland Oaks (baseball) players
Greenville Buckshots players
Gadsden Pilots players
Meridian Eagles players
Knoxville Smokies players
Minor league baseball managers
Baseball players from Mississippi
Sportspeople from Tupelo, Mississippi
1904 births
1966 deaths
Vanderbilt Commodores baseball players